03 is a Studio Album released by Urban Zakapa. The lead single is "Walk Backwards(Hangul: 거꾸로 걷는다)", Korean actress Yoon Seung-ah featured the music video. The bonus track only on CD edition "(Hangul: 그냥 조금)" appears on Korean TV Drama "Nine: Nine Time Travels", as 4th soundtrack.

Track listing

Charts

Sales and certifications

References

2013 albums
Urban Zakapa albums
Genie Music albums